Most generally, in the lineal kinship system used in the English-speaking world, a cousin is a type of familial relationship in which two relatives are two or more familial generations away from their most recent common ancestor. Commonly, "cousin" refers to a first cousin – a relative of the same generation whose most recent common ancestor with the subject is a grandparent. 

Degrees and removals are separate measures used to more precisely describe the relationship between cousins. Degree measures the separation, in generations, from the most recent common ancestor(s) to a parent of one of the cousins (whichever is closest), while removal measures the difference in generations between the cousins themselves, relative to their most recent common ancestor(s). To illustrate usage, a second cousin is a cousin with a degree of two; there are three (not two) generations from the common ancestor(s). When the degree is not specified, first cousin is assumed. A cousin "once removed" is a cousin with one removal. When the removal is not specified, no removal is assumed.

Various governmental entities have established systems for legal use that can precisely specify kinship with common ancestors any number of generations in the past; for example, in medicine and in law, a first cousin is a type of third-degree relative.

Basic definitions

People are related with a type of cousin relationship if they share a common ancestor, and are separated from their most recent common ancestor by two or more generations. This means neither person is an ancestor of the other, they do not share a parent (are not siblings), and neither is a sibling of the other's parent (are not the other's aunt/uncle nor niece/nephew). In the English system the cousin relationship is further detailed by the concepts of degree and removal.

The degree is the number of generations subsequent to the common ancestor before a parent of one of the cousins is found. This means the degree is the separation of the cousin from the common ancestor less one. Also, if the cousins are not separated from the common ancestor by the same number of generations, the cousin with the smallest separation is used to determine the degree. The removal is the difference between the number of generations from each cousin to the common ancestor. Two people can be removed but be around the same age due to differences in birth dates of parents, children, and other relevant ancestors.

To illustrate these concepts the following table is provided. This table identifies the degree and removal of cousin relationship between two people using their most recent common ancestor as the reference point and demonstrates it in the basic family tree example.

Additional terms

 The terms full cousin and cousin-german are used to specify a first cousin with no removals.
 The terms cousin-uncle/aunt and cousin-niece/nephew are sometimes used to describe the direction of the removal of the relationship, especially in Mennonite, Indian, and Pakistani  families. These terms relate to a first cousin once removed, uncle/aunt referring to an older generation and niece/nephew for younger ones. For additional removals grand/great are applied to these relationships. For example, a cousin-granduncle is a male first cousin twice removed that comes from an older generation, and a cousin-grandniece is a female first cousin twice removed who comes from a younger generation. 
 The term grandcousin is sometimes used for the grandchild of a first cousin, or the first cousin of a grandparent: a first cousin twice removed.
 The term kissing cousin is sometimes used for a distant relative who is familiar enough to be greeted with a kiss.

Gender-based distinctions

A maternal cousin is a cousin that is related to the mother's side of the family, while a paternal cousin is a cousin that is related to the father's side of the family. This relationship is not necessarily reciprocal, as the maternal cousin of one person could be the paternal cousin of the other. In the example Basic family tree, Emma is David's maternal cousin and David is Emma's paternal cousin.

Parallel and cross cousins on the other hand are reciprocal relationships. Parallel cousins are descended from same-sex siblings. A parallel first cousin relationship exists when both the subject and relative are maternal cousins, or both are paternal cousins. Cross cousins are descendants from opposite-sex siblings. A cross first cousin relationship exists when the subject and the relative are maternal cousin and paternal cousin to each other. In the basic family tree example, David and Emma are cross cousins.

Multiplicities

Double cousins are relatives that are cousins from two different branches of the family tree. This occurs when siblings, respectively, reproduce with different siblings from another family. This may also be referred to as "cousins on both sides". The resulting children are related to each other through both their parents and are thus doubly related. Double first cousins share both sets of grandparents.

Half cousins are descended from half siblings and would share one grandparent. The children of two half siblings are first half cousins. If half siblings have children with another pair of half siblings, the resulting children would be double half first cousins.

While there is no agreed upon term, it is possible for cousins to share three grandparents if a pair of half siblings had children with a pair of full siblings.

Non-blood relations

Step-cousins are either stepchildren of an individual's aunt or uncle, nieces and nephews of one's step-parent, or the children of one's parent's step-sibling. A cousin-in-law is the cousin of a person's spouse or the spouse of a person's cousin.

Consanguinity

Consanguinity is a measure of how closely individuals are related to each other. It is measured by the coefficient of relationship. Below, when discussing the coefficient of relationship, we assume the subject and the relative are related only through the kinship term. A coefficient of one represents the relationship one has with oneself. Consanguinity decreases by half for every generation of separation from the most recent common ancestor, as there are two parents for each child. When there is more than one common ancestor, the consanguinity between each ancestor is added together to get the final result.

Between first cousins, there are two shared ancestors each with four generations of separation, up and down the family tree: ; their consanguinity is one-eighth. For each additional removal of the cousin relationship, consanguinity is reduced by half, as the generations of separation increase by one. For each additional degree of the cousin relationship, consanguinity is reduced by a quarter as the generations of separation increase by one on both sides.

Half cousins have half the consanguinity of ordinary cousins as they have half the common ancestors (i.e. one vs two). Double cousins have twice the consanguinity of ordinary cousins as they have twice the number of common ancestors (i.e. four vs two). Double first cousins share the same consanguinity as half-siblings. Likewise, double half cousins share the same consanguinity as first cousins as they both have two common ancestors. If there are half-siblings on one side and full siblings on the other, they would have three-halves the consanguinity of ordinary first cousins.

In a scenario where two monozygotic (identical) twins mate with another pair of monozygotic twins, the resulting double cousins would test as genetically similar as siblings.

Reproduction

Couples that are closely related have an increased chance of sharing genes, including mutations that occurred in their family tree. If the mutation is a recessive trait, it will not reveal itself unless both father and mother share it. Due to the risk that the trait is harmful, children of high-consanguinity parents have an increased risk of recessive genetic disorders. See inbreeding for more information.

Closely related couples have more children. Couples related with consanguinity equivalent to that of third cousins have the greatest reproductive success. This seems counterintuitive as closely related parents have a higher probability of having offspring that are unfit, yet closer kinship can also decrease the likelihood of immunological incompatibility during pregnancy.

Cousin marriage

Cousin marriage is important in several anthropological theories, which often differentiate between matriarchal and patriarchal parallel and cross cousins.

Currently about 10% and historically as high as 80% of all marriages are between first or second cousins. Cousin marriages are often arranged. Anthropologists believe it is used as a tool to strengthen the family, conserve its wealth, protect its cultural heritage, and retain the power structure of the family and its place in the community. Some groups encourage cousin marriage while others attach a strong social stigma to it. In some regions in the Middle East, more than half of all marriages are between first or second cousins (some of the countries in this region this may exceed 70%). Just outside this region, it is often legal but infrequent. Many cultures have encouraged specifically cross-cousin marriages. In other places, it is legally prohibited and culturally equivalent to incest. Supporters of cousin marriage often view the prohibition as discrimination, while opponents claim potential immorality and cite the increased rate of birth defects in children of cousin marriages.

See also

 Collateral descendant
 Consanguinity
 Cousin marriage
 Family
 Sibling
 Second-degree relative

References

External links

 European kinship system
 Genealogy.com definition of various cousins
 Genealogy.com: What makes a cousin?
 Genetic Genealogy

Family
Kinship and descent
 

de:Verwandtschaftsbeziehung#Cousin und Cousine